Tebao Awerika is a politician from Kiribati who served as Minister of Environment and Land in the Kiribati Government.

He was also the head of Kiribati National Olympic Committee when he worked as a civil servant.

See also 
 Politics of Kiribati

References 

Government ministers of Kiribati